"I Took a Pill in Ibiza" (also known by its censored title "In Ibiza" or its clean title "I Took a Plane to Ibiza") is a song by American singer Mike Posner. The song was originally acoustic guitar-based and released digitally as a single in the United States in April 2015 before being remixed  a few months later by Norwegian production duo SeeB. The original version is on Posner's second EP The Truth, while both versions are on his second studio album At Night, Alone. The title references Ibiza, a Mediterranean island that is part of the Balearic Islands of Spain, while the pill was a "mystery" drug according to Posner; he later confirmed that the identity of the substance was MDMA.

The original version of the song was initially unknown, while the SeeB remix helped the song peak within the top ten of the charts in twenty-seven countries, including number one in Belgium, Israel, Netherlands, Norway, the Republic of Ireland, and the United Kingdom. In the latter country, the song remained at the top of the UK Singles Chart for four weeks. It achieved high chart positions in Posner's native United States, where it peaked at number four on the Billboard Hot 100 chart for two weeks, also reaching number one on both the Billboard Dance/Mix Show Airplay Chart and the Billboard Pop Songs chart. The song became Posner's biggest single, outperforming his debut, "Cooler than Me" (2010), and was later nominated for a Grammy Award for Song of the Year.

Background

The song presents a self reflection by Posner on how, his fame having long since faded, he has been left completely empty inside and unable to feel any kind of fulfillment, causing him to attempt to fill the void with rampant hedonism and material possessions. Posner's lyrics state he took the eponymous "pill" to impress Avicii (real name Tim Bergling), a Swedish DJ who wrote a song with Posner called "Stay with You" in 2012. Bergling committed suicide in 2018 after years of struggling with drug and alcohol addiction, three years after Posner released "I Took a Pill in Ibiza".

Regarding their remix, SeeB told Official Charts: "We got it from Matt D'Arduini, VP A&R at Island Records. It was really slow and we only listened to the vocals on it. Matt sent us the multitrack of Mike's new EP and we picked Ibiza right away. Such a brilliant lyric and melody but it needed a new soundscape to be a hit." Posner has called the success of the remix version both "ironic" and "beautiful": "I wrote this sad thing, and it was me processing some dark and heavy emotion, and now people seem to be having their own joyous memories out of my sadness. That’s a very beautiful thing as an artist."

Composition
The original version of "I Took a Pill in Ibiza" by Posner is a folk pop song, and is written in the key of B  major.

SeeB's remix is a tropical house song, and is written in the key of G minor in half time with a faster tempo of 102 beats per minute. It follows a chord progression of Gm – F – Emaj7 – B, and Posner's vocals span from B2 to D4.

Critical reception
Billboard ranked "I Took a Pill in Ibiza" #30 on its "100 Best Pop Songs of 2016: Critics' Picks" list, writing, "The weirdness of 2016 might be best encapsulated by Mike Posner earning his first Hot 100 top 10 in nearly six years—and ending the year with a Grammy nomination for Song of the Year—for a song lamenting his status as 'a singer who already blew his shot.' That's due in part to the power of SeeB's buoyant, tropical house-flavored remix, but the cautionary tale of post-fame and excess drives it home, even as it ironically became Posner’s biggest hit yet."

Time was more negative toward the remix, stating, "Originally conceived as a folksy pop song in the vein of Jason Mraz, there was something clever about Posner's withering takedown of drug-taking EDM bro culture. But the much more popular SeeB remix sapped it of its wit, turning it into the exact thing it was satirizing. What a comedown."

Live performances
Mike Posner performs the song live in the style of SeeB's remix, but with a live band and adding the third verse on vocals and guitar only. He has performed the song on a number of talk shows including The Tonight Show Starring Jimmy Fallon and The Ellen DeGeneres Show. In his rendition on the talk show Conan, he brought in a 10-piece string orchestra and 4 backing vocalists, and he introduced a new intro and final verse to the song, the latter of which talked about Posner's father having cancer. He also performed an acoustic version on Elvis Duran and the Morning Show at the Elvis Duran Performing Arts Center.

English singer Tom Odell performed a cover of the song on BBC Radio 1's Live Lounge, which received very good feedback from fans and critics.

Controversy
In April 2016, it was reported that tourism officials in Ibiza (Spain) were "annoyed" by the song as they felt it contributed to Ibiza's reputation for drug-related debauchery due to lyrics in the song such as "I took a pill in Ibiza" and "You don't want to be high like me". The island's tourism director, Vicent Ferrer, stated, "We have invited the author of this song to discover Ibiza because we have much more to offer besides the nightlife which is known worldwide," and noted that the island had been "typecast" due to its reputation for nightlife and as a partying destination.

Music videos
The music video for the SeeB remix was launched first, via Posner's YouTube Vevo account, on February 26, 2016. It features Posner taking an unknown pill which transforms his face into a smiling papier-mâchéd mask representing himself. Posner spends the video becoming increasingly intoxicated as he mingles with girls and male friends at a crowded nightclub, before ending with Posner, back to his normal self, staring in silence at the reflection in a mirror of his empty papier-mâché form. As of October 2022, this music video has received over 1.5 billion views on YouTube.

The music video for the original version was released on March 15, 2016. The black-and-white video features Posner standing silently with sheets of paper depicting lyrics of the song in a style similar to Bob Dylan's 1965 electric folk song, "Subterranean Homesick Blues". The music video was shot in Bateman's Buildings in London, an alleyway to the south of Soho Square Gardens, just off Oxford Street. As of October 2022, this music video has received over 43.5 million views on YouTube.

Cover version
Country music singer Eric Paslay covered the song on his 2020 album Nice Guy.

Track listing

Charts

Weekly charts

Year-end charts

Decade-end charts

Certifications

Release history

References

External links
 
 

2015 singles
2015 songs
Mike Posner songs
Songs written by Mike Posner
Songs written by Martin Terefe
Island Records singles
Songs about drugs
Songs about Ibiza
Songs based on actual events
Dutch Top 40 number-one singles
Irish Singles Chart number-one singles
Number-one singles in Israel
Number-one singles in Norway
Number-one singles in Scotland
UK Singles Chart number-one singles
Ultratop 50 Singles (Flanders) number-one singles
Ultratop 50 Singles (Wallonia) number-one singles
Tropical house songs
Folk ballads
Pop ballads
2010s ballads
Avicii
Songs about fame